Melanothamnus is a genus of red algae belonging to the family Rhodomelaceae.

The genus has cosmopolitan distribution.

Species:

Melanothamnus collabens 
Melanothamnus harveyi 
Melanothamnus maniticola
Melanothamnus sphaerocarpus

References

Rhodomelaceae
Red algae genera